Jesse Louis Lasky Jr. (September 19, 1910 – April 11, 1988) was an American screenwriter, novelist, playwright and poet.

Early life
He was the son of film producer Jesse Lasky Sr. and his wife, Bessie Ida Ginsberg. Lasky was born on Broadway, New York, and raised in Hollywood, Los Angeles, in England and in France. He attended Blair Academy, the Hun School of Princeton, Grand Central School of Art and the University of Dijon, France, where he was awarded a degree in literature. After winning awards for poetry at the age of 17, he embarked on a career as a professional writer. He was of Jewish descent.

Career
Lasky wrote eight novels, five plays, three books of poetry and more than 50 screenplays, including eight for director Cecil B. DeMille. In addition to a Christopher Award, he was a two-time winner of the Boxoffice Magazine Award: in 1949 for Samson and Delilah, and in 1956 for The Ten Commandments. Lasky's writing career took him from Hollywood to London, Rome, Austria, Denmark, Turkey, Spain, Portugal, Greece and France. David Hempstead cowritten the script for Hell and High Water (1954) alongside Lasky.

World War II
During World War II, Lasky served as a captain in the Combat Photographic Units of the United States Army Signal Corps during four campaigns in the Southwest Pacific, and was decorated by General Douglas MacArthur. He organised the Army School of Film Training at the Signal Corps Photographic Center, where writers were instructed to script training films for every branch of the military service.

Later life
Returning home after three-and-a-half years of military duty overseas, Lasky resumed his writing career with new books, plays, and films. He lectured on creative writing and the history of Hollywood at many American and British institutions, including the Oxford Union. He also served as Vice President of the Screen Branch of the Writers Guild of America.

In 1962, Lasky and his wife, Pat Silver, moved to London. They also lived for part of the year in southern Spain, and travelled extensively. Lasky was a member of the London gentlemen's Garrick Club and the Company of Military Historians. Tsuguharu Foujita's painting of a 17-year-old Lasky, dating from a trip to Paris with his mother in the 1920s, appears on page 180 of Lasky's autobiography, Whatever Happened to Hollywood?, which was published by Funk and Wagnalls in 1975.

Lasky died on April 11, 1988 from pancreatic cancer.

Writer

Film

Coming Out Party (1934)
Redhead (1934)
The White Parade (1934)
Music is Magic (1935)
Secret Agent (1936)
The Buccaneer (1938)
Union Pacific (1939)
Land of Liberty (1939)
North West Mounted Police (1940)
Back in the Saddle (1941)
Steel Against the Sky (1941)
The Singing Hill (1941)
Reap the Wild Wind (1942)
The Omaha Trail (1942)
Unconquered (1947)
Samson and Delilah (1949)
The Sickle or the Cross (1949)
Women Without Names (1950)
Lorna Doone (1951)
Mask of the Avenger (1951)
Never Trust a Gambler (1951)
The Brigand (1951)
Venture of Faith (1951)
Salome (1953)
The Silver Whip (1953)
Mission Over Korea (1953)
The Iron Glove (1954)
Hell and High Water (1954)
Pearl of the South Pacific (1955)
Hot Blood (1956)
The Ten Commandments (1955)
The Buccaneer (1958)
John Paul Jones (1959)
The Wizard of Baghdad (1960)
7 Women from Hell (1961)
Pirates of Tortuga (1961)
Land Raiders (1970)
Crime and Passion (1976)
The Bulldance (1989)

Television

Waterfront (1954)
Studio 57 (1955)
Naked City (1958)
Rescue 8 (1958-1959)
Shannon (1961)
The New Breed (1961-1962)
The Saint (1965)
Songs of the Wild West (1965, TV Movie)
Chicago in the Roaring 20's (1965, TV Movie)
Danger Man (1966)
The Protectors (1973)
Ben Hall (1975) 
Space: 1999 (1975)
Philip Marlowe, Private Eye (1983-1986)
Hammer House of Mystery and Suspense (1984)

Producer
Without Reservations (1946)
The Miracle of the Bells (1948)

Actor
The Thief of Bagdad (1924)

References

External links

1910 births
1988 deaths
20th-century American novelists
20th-century American dramatists and playwrights
20th-century American historians
20th-century American poets
American autobiographers
American expatriate academics
American expatriates in France
American expatriates in Spain
American expatriates in the United Kingdom
American male novelists
American mass media scholars
American male screenwriters
American television writers
Blair Academy alumni
Burials at Hollywood Forever Cemetery
Deaths from cancer in England
Deaths from pancreatic cancer
Grand Central School of Art alumni
Hun School of Princeton alumni
Jewish American dramatists and playwrights
Jewish American novelists
Jewish American poets
Jewish American screenwriters
Writing teachers
People from Hollywood, Los Angeles
United States Army officers
Writers from New York City
Writers Guild of America board of directors
American male poets
American male television writers
American male dramatists and playwrights
Novelists from New York (state)
American male non-fiction writers
Screenwriters from New York (state)
Screenwriters from California
20th-century American male writers
20th-century American screenwriters
20th-century American Jews